Germantown is an unincorporated community located in Baltimore County, Maryland, United States. It is part of Perry Hall.

German-American culture in Maryland
Unincorporated communities in Baltimore County, Maryland
Unincorporated communities in Maryland